A total solar eclipse will take place at the Moon's ascending node of the orbit on Friday, September 12, 2053 with a magnitude of 1.0328. A solar eclipse occurs when the Moon passes between Earth and the Sun, thereby totally or partly obscuring the image of the Sun for a viewer on Earth. A total solar eclipse occurs when the Moon's apparent diameter is larger than the Sun's, blocking all direct sunlight, turning day into darkness. Totality occurs in a narrow path across Earth's surface, with the partial solar eclipse visible over a surrounding region thousands of kilometres wide.

Related eclipses

Solar eclipses 2051–2054

Saros 145

Metonic series

References

2053 09 12
2053 in science
2053 09 12
2053 09 12